The Saint John the Baptist Parish Church (Spanish: Iglesia Parroquial de San Juan Bautista), commonly known as Tabaco Church, is a Roman Catholic Church in the city of Tabaco, Albay, Philippines under the jurisdiction of the Roman Catholic Diocese of Legazpi.

The church of Tabaco was founded by the Franciscans under the advocacy of Saint John the Baptist and became an independent parish in 1616. It was also declared a National Cultural Treasure of the Philippines.

History 
Tabaco was established as a visita by the Franciscans under the patronage of Saint John the Baptist in 1587. It was separated from Cagsaua in 1616 when Father Pedro de Alcareso was named as parish priest. It was administered by the Franciscans until 1660.  It became an independent parish in 1664. Since 1750, the church was supervised by the secular clergy. The present church was built by the seculars in 1864 and completed in 1879.

The church, one of the only two declared sites in Bicol Region, was categorized by the National Museum of the Philippines as a National Cultural Treasure of the country. Its marker was unveiled on June 22, 2012.

Features 
The church is built out of dark volcanic soil and stones found in the area. One unusual characteristic of the church is the presence of mason's marks on stones used for the construction of the church building, a rare feature in the Philippines. Its unusual floor plan contains compartments for which there is currently no explanation. It is known for its beautiful and bell tower embedded with rococo designs.

Rehabilitation 
Albay Governor Joey Salceda allotted ₱ 35 million for the rehabilitation of the historical and cultural heritage sites in the province including the Tabaco church.

Notes

Bibliography

External links

Roman Catholic churches in Albay
1616 establishments in the Philippines
Roman Catholic churches completed in 1879
1870s establishments in the Philippines
National Cultural Treasures of the Philippines
Baroque Revival architecture
Spanish Colonial architecture in the Philippines
19th-century Roman Catholic church buildings in the Philippines
Churches in the Roman Catholic Diocese of Legazpi